Cecil "Cyril" Abotomey (1902 – 20 December 1980) was an Australian rugby league footballer for the Eastern Suburbs club of the New South Wales Rugby League competition.

Playing career
Abotomey was a Paddington junior in Rugby League and Cricket and also played junior Australian rules football for the Double Bay side. In rugby league he played in both the centre and wing positions and was a member of Eastern Suburbs 1923 premiership winning side. Abotomey was also a member of the Eastern Suburbs side that won the President's Cup in 1922, and is officially recognised as Eastern Suburbs' 138th player. He eventually moved to Brisbane and continued his career there.

Death
He died in Brisbane in 1980 and was buried at the Toowong Cemetery on 22 December 1980.

References

 The Encyclopedia Of Rugby League, Alan Whiticker and Glen Hudson
 History of the New South Wales Rugby League Finals, Steve Hadden
 From Where The Sun Rises, 100 Years Of The Sydney Roosters, Ian Heads, 

Rugby league players from New South Wales
Sydney Roosters players
1902 births
1980 deaths
Rugby league centres
Date of birth missing